Michael Learns to Rock is the eponymous debut album of the Danish soft rock and pop rock band Michael Learns to Rock. The album was released in September 1991 through Medley Records in Denmark. It sold 180,000 copies in Scandinavia, and 250,000 copies in the rest of the world. The album includes their signature song "The Actor", which charted at number one in Denmark, Norway, Sweden, Indonesia, Malaysia, Singapore, and the Philippines.

Track listing

Charts

References

External links
Michael Learns To Rock official website

1991 debut albums
Michael Learns to Rock albums